"Trick of the Light" is a song written by bassist John Entwistle for The Who's eighth studio album, Who Are You. It was released as the second single from the album, atypically with another Entwistle song, "905" on the B-side, but did not chart.

The lyrics describe fear of being sexually inadequate in the face of a prostitute. The singer wants to have an emotional connection with the prostitute but she only sees him as dehumanized and recognizes his sexual insecurity. He is concerned that he didn't bring her "to the height of ecstasy." It features a guitar-like assault throughout the song, described by Pete Townshend as sounding like "a musical Mack truck" and is actually Entwistle's heavily distorted eight-string Alembic bass. Chris Charlesworth feels that the bass dominates the song to an extent that none of the other elements of the song matter.  Billboard described the guitar riff as "furious" and "unrelenting," and also praises drummer Keith Moon's ability to "[sustain] rhythmic tension."  Cash Box said that the song is "driven by powerful guitar work by Pete Townshend and aggressive drumming from Keith Moon."  Record World said that the song "features the group's familiar song structure carried by wall -of -sound instrumentation."

Who biographer John Atkins says the song has a "muscular texture" and is "fully realized" but that it represents an "orthodox heavy rock format" that the band usually shunned. The Who FAQ author Mike Segretto considers it one of Entwistle's "catchier songs," attributing its lack of chart success to its being "too heavy" and "too mean" for the 1977 singles chart. Segretto considers the song to be underrated, finding humor in the situation but stating that "genuine vulnerability makes the song more than a good giggle and undercuts the performance's cock-rock attitude." But it was not a favorite of Who lead singer Roger Daltrey, who complained that it went "on and on and on and on."

It was performed occasionally on The Who's 1979 tour with Entwistle on eight-string and Townshend playing one of Entwistle's Alembic basses used on the 1975–1976 tours. It made its return to the setlist in 1989, with Townshend originally on electric guitar on the two Toronto dates in June and acoustic guitar for the rest of the tour. It was disliked by Roger Daltrey, who thought that although it had clever lyrics, it was too long. On the original recording and in its 1979–1980 performances, Daltrey sang the lead vocal; in 1989 Entwistle sang it. "Trick of the Light" was included in the two-disc edition of The Who Hits 50!.

References

Songs written by John Entwistle
1978 songs
The Who songs
Song recordings produced by Glyn Johns
1978 singles
Songs about prostitutes
MCA Records singles